Passed Away is a 1992 American ensemble comedy film directed and written by Charlie Peters.

Plot 
Jack Scanlan is a union leader who returns to work after having a heart attack. His son Frank arranges a welcome back surprise party for Jack, which unfortunately does more than surprise him, as he has another heart attack and dies, because he was actually prone to panic attacks brought on by stress or excitement such as being startled (by things such as people yelling out the word "surprise"), which is apparently what caused his first heart attack. The members of his large, dysfunctional family are brought together and find themselves dealing with all of their emotional baggage.

Everybody's assorted issues are brought to light. The relatives include his children: eldest son Johnny, a tree surgeon who wants more adventure in his life; his brother Frank, a labor leader who wants to live up to his father's expectations; their sister Terry, a dancer;  her ex-husband Boyd; an embalmer Peter, who is in love with Terry; and a younger sister Nora, who is a nun based in Latin America.

There are unfamiliar faces too, like a woman named Cassie who turns up at the funeral and may or  may not have been their late father's mistress. It is a chance for everyone to get acquainted or reacquainted, and it's all in the family.

Cast 

Bob Hoskins as Johnny Scanlan
Blair Brown as Amy Scanlan, Johnny's wife
Tim Curry as Boyd Pinter, Terry's former husband
Frances McDormand as Nora Scanlan, Johnny's younger sister
William Petersen as Frank Scanlan, Johnny's younger brother
Pamela Reed as Terry Scanlan Pinter, Johnny's younger sister
Peter Riegert as Peter Syracusa, Terry's love interest
Maureen Stapleton as Mary Scanlan, Johnny's widowed mother
Nancy Travis as Cassie Slocombe   
Jack Warden as Jack Scanlan, Johnny's late father
Teri Polo as Rachel Scanlan, Frank & Denise's daughter
Deborah Rush as Denise Scanlan, Frank's wife
Diana Bellamy as BJ
Helen Lloyd Burns - Maureen, Johnny's aunt
Patrick Breen as Father Hallahan
Dan Futterman as Tom, Rachel's boyfriend
Sally Gracie as Mrs. Cassidy
Louis Mustillo as Carmine Syracusa
Patricia O'Connell as Mrs. Finch
Sara Rue as Megan Scanlan, Johnny & Amy's daughter
Tristan Tait as Sam Scanlan, Johnny & Amy's son
Don Brockett as Froggie
Ann Shea as Louise
Jayce Bartok as Tony Scanlan, Frank & Denise's son
Dylan Baker as Unsworth
Jim Corr as Daniel

Reception
The movie received mixed reviews. According to the review aggregator Rotten Tomatoes, 10% of 10 critics gave the film a positive review, with an average rating of 4.4/10. Audiences polled by CinemaScore gave the film an average grade of "B-" on an A+ to F scale.

Box office
The film's first weekend generated $700,000.

References

External links

1992 films
1992 comedy films
American comedy films
Films scored by Richard Gibbs
Films set in Pittsburgh
Hollywood Pictures films
1992 directorial debut films
1990s English-language films
1990s American films